West Vancouver is a district municipality in the province of British Columbia, Canada. A member municipality of the Metro Vancouver Regional District, West Vancouver is to the northwest of the city of Vancouver on the northern side of English Bay and the southeast shore of Howe Sound, and is adjoined by the District of North Vancouver to its east. Together with the District of North Vancouver and the City of North Vancouver, it is part of a local regional grouping referred to as the North Shore municipalities, or simply "the North Shore".

West Vancouver is connected to the downtown city of Vancouver via the Lions Gate Bridge. Originally named First Narrows Bridge, its completion in 1938 allowed the people of the North Shore municipalities to cross  of the Burrard Inlet to the city.

West Vancouver had a population of 44,122 at the 2021 Canadian census. Cypress Provincial Park, mostly located within the municipal boundaries, was one of the venues for the 2010 Winter Olympics. West Vancouver is also home of Canada's first shopping mall, Park Royal Shopping Centre, and also the Horseshoe Bay ferry terminal, one of the main connecting hubs between the British Columbia mainland and Vancouver Island.

History 

The Municipality of West Vancouver was incorporated on March 15, 1912, after separating from the District of North Vancouver. The first municipal election was held on April 6, 1912. In November 1938, the Lions Gate Bridge was opened to traffic, allowing extensive growth of the semi-populated community, previously only accessible by ferry. Some homes in West Vancouver date back to the 1920s and 30s, though most of the currently existing dwellings were built in the 1970s and 80s, and mostly in British Pacific Properties' developments.

Timeline 
 1792: Captain George Vancouver names Point Atkinson
 1866: John Thomas, known as "Navvy Jack", sailed from England or Wales, arriving in Burrard Inlet, in about 1866. He was the first Caucasian resident of West Vancouver, offered first ferry service to what be known as Vancouver in a rowboat. His house still stands today at Ambleside and there is a Navvy Jack Point. Thomas' nickname Navvy Jack today remains used in British Columbia English to mean washed pea gravel used in construction and landscaping trades, as he was the original supplier of the material to Vancouver and mined it from coves in West Vancouver.
 1872: James Blake preempted the first  of land
 1875: First lighthouse at Point Atkinson
 1898: Mr. Francis Caulfeild was put ashore at Skunk Cove
 1905: John Lawson, a local leader settled at foot of 17th street
 1908: First pier, Hollyburn Pier
 1909: 
 West Vancouver Transportation Company was formed, provides ferry service across harbour to Vancouver
 "Real estate boom" lots sold for as little as $450 and as much as $4,500
 1910: Water systems started at Caulfeild and Ambleside
 1911: First primary school, Presbyterian Church at Dundarave
 1912:
 West Vancouver separated from the District Municipality of North Vancouver and incorporated on March 15, 1912.
 Population was approximately 1,500 people
 First municipal election
 Council appointed John Teare as the first police constable on May 17. F.H. Kettle was appointed the second constable on May 28
 1913: Hollyburn Elementary School structure built, facility of the longest existing school in West Vancouver
 1914:
 First known settlement, the Coast Salish village at Sandy Cove
 Pacific Great Eastern Railway in service from North Vancouver to Caulfeild and Horseshoe Bay
 Colonel Albert Whyte pressed for a spelling change from White Cliff City to Whytecliff
 1915:
 Dundarave Pier built
 Marine Drive was officially opened by Premier Richard McBride
 1916: West Vancouver Municipal Transport bus service started operation
 1922: British Columbia Electric Railway starts electrical service
 1923: Adopted STV for city elections (discontinued in 1930)
 1924: House numbering scheme started
 1926:
 Marine Drive extended to Horseshoe Bay
 Town Planning Act banned any new industry forming an exclusively residential community with minimum lot sizes
 1927: Inglewood High School built
 1928: Direct telephone service to Vancouver operational
 1930:
 Septic tanks made mandatory
 Only 48 of West Vancouver's 100 kilometres of roads paved
 1931: Dan Sewell opened his marina and the Whytecliff Lodge
 1932:  of land bought by A.R. Guinness-Br. Pacific Properties bought for $50 a hectare, they have been developed as the British Properties
 1934: First police car
 1936: Hollyburn Post Office built at 17th street and Marine Drive
 1938: Lions Gate Bridge finished, opened May 29. The bridge cost a total of $6 million to build. It was financed by the Guinness family, in conjunction with the development and marketing of the British Properties.
 1947: Ferry service stopped due to lack of demand after bridge constructed
 1950:
 West Vancouver Memorial Library opened on November 11 (Remembrance Day)
 Park Royal Shopping Centre, Canada's first shopping centre opened
 1951: Hollyburn Mountain opens first chairlift
 1954: Public Safety Building opened. It housed the West Vancouver Police and Fire Departments
 1959: Rezoning allowed 78 apartment buildings in Ambleside
 1961: The Crescent Apartments, West Vancouver's first high rise apartment opened
 1963: Tolls on Lions Gate Bridge lifted on April 1
 1967: Fire hall was built and opened on November 22, 1967, at 16th and Fulton Ave. The Police Department remained in the Public Safety building
 1973: Clyde McRae completes a world record walk across Canada on Ambleside Beach.

COVID-19 
West Vancouver was the second municipality in British Columbia to record cases of COVID-19 in March 2020, following the first reported outbreak at Lynn Valley Care Home in the neighbouring District of North Vancouver. On March 12, 2020, long-term care facility Hollyburn House announced they had identified two positive cases among a staff member and resident. 

Mayor Mary-Ann Booth began instituting closures on March 13, and on March 16 closed all facilities run by the District except for Municipal Hall, police and fire services, the District Operations Centre and Capilano View Cemetery. She declared a local state of emergency on March 21, granting the municipal government additional powers to enforce orders issued by provincial health officer Bonnie Henry, including business closures and revocation of business licenses.

On October 27, 2021, the district announced a mandatory policy requiring all staff members and volunteers to receive at least two doses of a COVID-19 vaccine as a condition of continued employment. According to district spokesperson Donna Powers, the policy was implemented "to raise vaccination rates across the community". The West Vancouver Police Department received a similar directive on November 2, allowing officers until January 11, 2022, to provide proof of vaccination or be put on leave.

Following the January 4, 2022, deadline to show proof of vaccination, 16 district employees were put on unpaid leave with possibility of termination.

Commodities 
West Vancouver is mainly a residential district as many residents are retired, work at home, or take the short commute to downtown Vancouver. West Vancouver has no manufacturing industry by law.

A 13-block strip of Marine Drive serves as a commercial district, featuring shops, small offices, garages and gas stations, restaurants, banks, and other common amenities. The area between 13th and 19th Streets is commonly known as Ambleside Village, and the area between 24th and 26th Streets is known as the village of Dundarave. This commercial area is served by the Ambleside Dundarave Business Improvement Association.

West Vancouver is also home to Park Royal Shopping Centre, Canada's first mall. Opened in the 1950s, it now consumes  of both sides of Marine Drive near North Vancouver. Park Royal is the second largest mall in British Columbia, after Metropolis at Metrotown in Burnaby. Located nearby is a major bus terminal for Blue Bus and North Vancouver TransLink buses.

The West Vancouver Memorial Library, located in Ambleside, has a circulation rate of 21.32 per capita, the highest circulation rate per capita in Canada.

Demographics 

West Vancouver has the second highest percentage of persons aged 65 or older in BC with 22% of persons fitting into the category, compared with 13% for the rest of the province. The top five professions in West Vancouver are professional science and technical services; retail trade; health care; finance and insurance; and educational services. A large portion of the population is involved in senior management in comparison with the rest of the province.

Ethnicity

Religion 
According to the 2021 census, religious groups in West Vancouver included:
Irreligion (22,625 persons or 52.1%)
Christianity (14,710 persons or 33.9%)
Islam (3,855 persons or 8.9%)
Buddhism (650 persons or 1.5%)
Judaism (555 persons or 1.3%)
Hinduism (300 persons or 0.7%)
Sikhism (135 persons or 0.3%)
Other (555 persons or 1.3%)

Language 

As of the 2006 census, the languages spoken in West Vancouver were:

By mother tongue:
 English: 70%
 French: 1.2%
 Other languages: 28%

By most commonly used household language:
 English: 83%
 French: 0.4%
 Other languages: 14.5%

Affluence 
West Vancouver is Canada's wealthiest municipality, with an average household net worth of CAD$4,454,424. North Vancouver just next door is the tenth richest. West Vancouver is home to some very large, luxurious and expensive properties and houses. Occasionally, houses have been priced and sold at around CAD$30,000,000. In 2011, West Vancouver's average house sold for over CAD$2,000,000; 95% of the houses or close to 16,000 homes are worth over CAD$1 million. In West Vancouver, average total incomes were $86,253 for males and $48,070 for females, almost double the provincial average. Over 80% of the population has a total family income of at least $100,000.

Transportation 

West Vancouver is served by West Vancouver Municipal Transit, colloquially known as Blue Bus. It is Canada's longest running municipal transportation system and Canada's first 100% wheelchair accessible transit system. West Vancouver Municipal Transit is one of two bus companies in the Greater Vancouver region operating under contract for TransLink. Transfer is free between West Vancouver Municipal Transit buses and other TransLink buses.

The only freeway route within municipal limits is British Columbia Highway 1 (part of the Trans-Canada Highway), which begins in the community of Horseshoe Bay and continues east into the District of North Vancouver. Highway 99 also runs through West Vancouver, sharing the freeway alignment with Highway 1 between Horseshoe Bay and Taylor Way, and connects the municipality with Downtown Vancouver (via the Lions Gate Bridge) and Whistler (via the Sea-to-Sky Corridor).

Additionally, BC Ferries operates routes departing from Horseshoe Bay to Nanaimo, Bowen Island, and the Sunshine Coast.

Parks and recreation 
   West Vancouver is known for its parks such as Cypress Provincial Park, which offers scenic views of Howe Sound and the Metro Vancouver area. Whytecliff Park and Lighthouse Park, near the community of Horseshoe Bay, at the continental terminus of the Trans-Canada Highway. All of West Vancouver is situated on the side of the Coast Mountains. Because of this position, many homes in West Vancouver have views of Vancouver Island, the Lower Mainland, and/or Howe Sound.

Ambleside Park and the 15-block-long West Vancouver Seawall are popular spots for families and outdoor enthusiasts. Whytecliff Park is regarded as one of the best scuba diving spots in Western Canada. The District also has many other small parks, as well as Lighthouse Park at Point Atkinson, which contains some old-growth forest and has with views of Vancouver from downtown to Point Grey and is the boundary-point between English Bay and the Strait of Georgia. John Lawson Park is also another popular area for families, it features a playground for children, an open grass field for families to picnic, and a view of Lions Gate Bridge and the downtown skyline which are both across the water.

West Vancouver has several public recreation facilities including an 18-hole par 3 golf course, a pool, an ice rink, basketball and tennis courts, skate parks and numerous public parks. The new West Vancouver Community Centre (or WVCC) has been rebuilt and opened Spring 2009. Cypress Provincial Park also has mountain biking trails and a large ski and snowboard resort, which served as one of the venues for the 2010 Winter Olympics.

Politics 
As of 2022, the mayor is Mark Sager, who previously served as West Van Mayor from 1991–1996.

West Vancouver ridings typically include Squamish and Whistler, and sometimes the Sunshine Coast.

Provincially, Joan McIntyre and Ralph Sultan of the BC Liberal Party were elected to the West Vancouver-Sea To Sky and West Vancouver-Capilano ridings, respectively, in the 2005 Provincial election (West Vancouver-Sea To Sky Country includes Squamish, Whistler and Pemberton).

Federally, West Vancouver-based ridings historically have voted Conservative since 1974, electing John Reynolds of the Reform Party of Canada (later the Canadian Alliance) from 1997 to 2004. Reynolds declined to run for re-election in 2006, however, and Liberal Blair Wilson defeated Conservative John Weston to replace Reynolds as Member of Parliament from the West Vancouver—Sunshine Coast—Sea to Sky Country electoral district. Wilson left the Liberals in 2007 and joined the Green Party in 2008, becoming the first Green Member of Parliament. The re-election in 2008 saw a rematch between Weston and Wilson. This time Weston emerged as the victor, carrying nearly triple the vote of his incumbent opponent to handily return the riding to the Conservatives. Weston won again in 2011. In the 2015 federal election, Weston was unseated by Liberal candidate Pam Goldsmith-Jones, who was previously the mayor of West Vancouver from 2005 to 2011. Pamela Goldsmith-Jones chose not to run for re-election in the 2019 federal election and Patrick Weiler of the Liberal Party of Canada went on to win the election.

Education 
There are 17 public schools that make up School District 45 West Vancouver. There are also 4 private schools in the city. Of these 21 schools, 6 are high schools. Over 80 percent of West Vancouver high school graduates go to post-secondary schools. Many residents from Squamish, the Sunshine Coast, and North Vancouver attend West Vancouver schools.

See also 
Architecture of Greater Vancouver

Notes

References 

Some highlights of West Vancouver (author unknown), West Vancouver Memorial Library archives
http://westvancouverpolice.ca/ History of the West Vancouver Police Department
"West Vancouver", The Encyclopedia of British Columbia (online edition), C 2000 Harbour Publishing

External links 

 
District municipalities in British Columbia
Populated places on the British Columbia Coast
Populated places in Greater Vancouver